Antz Extreme Racing is a 2002 racing video game developed by Supersonic Software and published by Empire Interactive. The game is based on the 1998 DreamWorks Animation film Antz. The game was released in 2002 for Microsoft Windows, Xbox, and PlayStation 2. The Game Boy Advance version of Antz Extreme Racing was developed by Magic Pockets and released on 20 November 2002.

Gameplay
Antz Extreme Racing is set in each of the four temperate seasons and has four different types of races: driving, flying on the backs of insects, running, and snowboarding or surfing. The game features both a single-player and multiplayer mode; the split screen multiplayer mode supports up to four players.

Reception
Antz Extreme Racing received negative reviews. Aggregating review websites GameRankings and Metacritic gave the Xbox version 43.86% and 35/100 and the PlayStation 2 version 41.79% and 31/100. IGNs Ivan Sulic and GameSpy's Michael Nam both criticized the game for its lacking personality and repetitive gameplay and for offering nothing new to the racing game genre.

References

2002 video games
Game Boy Advance games
Game Boy Advance-only games
PlayStation 2 games
Racing video games
Multiplayer and single-player video games
Antz video games
Video games about insects
Video games developed in France
Video games developed in the United Kingdom
Video games set in New York City
Windows games
Xbox games
Magic Pockets games
RenderWare games
Empire Interactive games
Supersonic Software games